Magnesium is a chemical element with the symbol Mg and atomic number 12. It is a shiny gray metal having a low density, low melting point and high chemical reactivity. Like the other alkaline earth metals (group 2 of the periodic table) it occurs naturally only in combination with other elements and it almost always has an oxidation state of +2. It reacts readily with air to form a thin passivation coating of magnesium oxide that inhibits further corrosion of the metal. The free metal burns with a brilliant-white light. The metal is obtained mainly by electrolysis of magnesium salts obtained from brine. It is less dense than aluminium and is used primarily as a component in strong and lightweight alloys that contain aluminium.

In the cosmos, magnesium is produced in large, aging stars by the sequential addition of three helium nuclei to a carbon nucleus. When such stars explode as supernovas, much of the magnesium is expelled into the interstellar medium where it may recycle into new star systems. Magnesium is the eighth most abundant element in the Earth's crust and the fourth most common element in the Earth (after iron, oxygen and silicon), making up 13% of the planet's mass and a large fraction of the planet's mantle. It is the third most abundant element dissolved in seawater, after sodium and chlorine.

This element is the eleventh most abundant element by mass in the human body and is essential to all cells and some 300 enzymes. Magnesium ions interact with polyphosphate compounds such as ATP, DNA, and RNA. Hundreds of enzymes require magnesium ions to function. Magnesium compounds are used medicinally as common laxatives and antacids (such as milk of magnesia), and to stabilize abnormal nerve excitation or blood vessel spasm in such conditions as eclampsia.

Characteristics

Physical properties 
Elemental magnesium is a gray-white lightweight metal, two-thirds the density of aluminium. Magnesium has the lowest melting and the lowest boiling point  of all the alkaline earth metals.

Pure polycrystalline magnesium is brittle and easily fractures along shear bands. It becomes much more malleable when alloyed with small amount of other metals, such as 1% aluminium. The malleability of polycrystalline magnesium can also be significantly improved by reducing its grain size to ca. 1 micron or less.

When finely powdered, magnesium can react with water to produce hydrogen gas:
Mg(s) + 2H2O(g) → Mg(OH)2(aq) + H2(g) + 1203.6 kJ
However, this reaction is much less dramatic than the reactions of the alkali metals with water, because the magnesium hydroxide tends to build up on the surface of the pure magnesium metal and prevent the reaction from occurring.

Chemical properties

General chemistry
It tarnishes slightly when exposed to air, although, unlike the heavier alkaline earth metals, an oxygen-free environment is unnecessary for storage because magnesium is protected by a thin layer of oxide that is fairly impermeable and difficult to remove.

Direct reaction of magnesium with air or oxygen at ambient pressure forms only the "normal" oxide MgO. However, this oxide may be combined with hydrogen peroxide to form Magnesium peroxide, MgO2, and at low temperature the peroxide may be further reacted with ozone to form magnesium superoxide Mg(O2)2.

Magnesium reacts with water at room temperature, though it reacts much more slowly than calcium, a similar group 2 metal. When submerged in water, hydrogen bubbles form slowly on the surface of the metal – though, if powdered, it reacts much more rapidly. The reaction occurs faster with higher temperatures (see safety precautions). Magnesium's reversible reaction with water can be harnessed to store energy and run a magnesium-based engine. Magnesium also reacts exothermically with most acids such as hydrochloric acid (HCl), producing the metal chloride and hydrogen gas, similar to the HCl reaction with aluminium, zinc, and many other metals.

Flammability
Magnesium is highly flammable, especially when powdered or shaved into thin strips, though it is difficult to ignite in mass or bulk. Once ignited, such fires are difficult to extinguish, because combustion continues in nitrogen (forming magnesium nitride), carbon dioxide (forming magnesium oxide and carbon), and water (forming magnesium oxide and hydrogen, which also combusts due to heat in the presence of additional oxygen). This property was used in incendiary weapons during the firebombing of cities in World War II, where the only practical civil defense was to smother a burning flare under dry sand to exclude atmosphere from the combustion.

Magnesium may also be used as an igniter for thermite, a mixture of aluminium and iron oxide powder that ignites only at a very high temperature.

Organic chemistry

Organomagnesium compounds are widespread in organic chemistry. They are commonly found as Grignard reagents. Magnesium can react with haloalkanes to give Grignard reagents. Examples of Grignard reagents are phenylmagnesium bromide and ethylmagnesium bromide. The Grignard reagents function as a common nucleophile, attacking the electrophilic group such as the carbon atom that is present within the polar bond of a carbonyl group.

A prominent organomagnesium reagent beyond Grignard reagents is magnesium anthracene with magnesium forming a 1,4-bridge over the central ring. It is used as a source of highly active magnesium. The related butadiene-magnesium adduct serves as a source for the butadiene dianion.

Magnesium in organic chemistry also appears as low valent magnesium compounds, primarily with the magnesium forming diatomic ions in the +1 oxidation state but more recently also with zero oxidation state or a mixture of +1 and zero states. Such compounds find synthetic application as reducing agents and sources of nucleophilic metal atoms.

Source of light
When burning in air, magnesium produces a brilliant-white light that includes strong ultraviolet wavelengths. Magnesium powder (flash powder) was used for subject illumination in the early days of photography. Later, magnesium filament was used in electrically ignited single-use photography flashbulbs. Magnesium powder is used in fireworks and marine flares where a brilliant white light is required. It was also used for various theatrical effects, such as lightning, pistol flashes, and supernatural appearances.

Detection in solution 

The presence of magnesium ions can be detected by the addition of ammonium chloride, ammonium hydroxide and monosodium phosphate to an aqueous or dilute HCl solution of the salt. The formation of a white precipitate indicates the presence of magnesium ions.

Azo violet dye can also be used which turns deep blue in the presence of an alkaline solution of magnesium salt. The color is due to the adsorption of azo violet by Mg(OH)2.

Occurrence 

Magnesium is the eighth-most-abundant element in the Earth's crust by mass and tied in seventh place with iron in molarity. It is found in large deposits of magnesite, dolomite, and other minerals, and in mineral waters, where magnesium ion is soluble.

Although magnesium is found in more than 60 minerals, only dolomite, magnesite, brucite, carnallite, talc, and olivine are of commercial importance.

The  cation is the second-most-abundant cation in seawater (about  the mass of sodium ions in a given sample), which makes seawater and sea salt attractive commercial sources for Mg. To extract the magnesium, calcium hydroxide is added to seawater to form magnesium hydroxide precipitate.
  +  →  + 

Magnesium hydroxide (brucite) is insoluble in water and can be filtered out and reacted with hydrochloric acid to produced concentrated magnesium chloride.
  + 2 HCl →  + 2 
From magnesium chloride, electrolysis produces magnesium.

Forms

Alloys 

As of 2013, magnesium alloys consumption was less than one million tonnes per year, compared with 50 million tonnes of aluminum alloys. Their use has been historically limited by the tendency of Mg alloys to corrode, creep at high temperatures, and combust.

Corrosion
The presence of iron, nickel, copper, and cobalt strongly activates corrosion. In more than trace amounts, these metals precipitate as intermetallic compounds, and the precipitate locales function as active cathodic sites that reduce water, causing the loss of magnesium. Controlling the quantity of these metals improves corrosion resistance. Sufficient manganese overcomes the corrosive effects of iron. This requires precise control over composition, increasing costs. Adding a cathodic poison captures atomic hydrogen within the structure of a metal. This prevents the formation of free hydrogen gas, an essential factor of corrosive chemical processes. The addition of about one in three hundred parts arsenic reduces its corrosion rate in a salt solution by a factor of nearly ten.

High-temperature creep and flammability
Research showed that magnesium's tendency to creep at high temperatures is eliminated by the addition of scandium and gadolinium. Flammability is greatly reduced by a small amount of calcium in the alloy. By using rare-earth elements, it may be possible to manufacture magnesium alloys with an ignition temperature higher than magnesium's liquidus and in some cases potentially pushing it close to magnesium's boiling point.

Compounds 
Magnesium forms a variety of compounds important to industry and biology, including magnesium carbonate, magnesium chloride, magnesium citrate, magnesium hydroxide (milk of magnesia), magnesium oxide, magnesium sulfate, and magnesium sulfate heptahydrate (Epsom salts).

Isotopes 

All are present in significant amounts in nature (see table of isotopes above). The isotope  is radioactive and in the 1950s to 1970s was produced by several nuclear power plants for use in scientific experiments. This isotope has a relatively short half-life (21 hours) and its use was limited by shipping times.

Excessive quantities of stable  have been observed in the Ca-Al-rich inclusions of some carbonaceous chondrite meteorites. This anomalous abundance is attributed to the decay of its parent  in the inclusions, and researchers conclude that such meteorites were formed in the solar nebula before the  had decayed. These are among the oldest objects in the Solar System and contain preserved information about its early history.

It is conventional to plot / against an Al/Mg ratio. In an isochron dating plot, the Al/Mg ratio plotted is/. The slope of the isochron has no age significance, but indicates the initial / ratio in the sample at the time when the systems were separated from a common reservoir.

Production 

World production was approximately 1,100 kt in 2017, with the bulk being produced in China (930 kt) and Russia (60 kt). The United States was in the 20th century the major world supplier of this metal, supplying 45% of world production even as recently as 1995. Since the Chinese mastery of the Pidgeon process the US market share is at 7%, with a single US producer left: US Magnesium, a Renco Group company in Utah born from now-defunct Magcorp.

In September 2021, China took steps to reduce production of magnesium as a result of a government initiative to reduce energy availability for manufacturing industries, leading to a significant price increase.

 Pidgeon process
China is almost completely reliant on the silicothermic Pidgeon process (the reduction of the oxide at high temperatures with silicon, often provided by a ferrosilicon alloy in which the iron is but a spectator in the reactions) to obtain the metal. The process can also be carried out with carbon at approx 2300 °C:
 +  +  →  + 
 +  →  + 

 Dow process
In the United States, magnesium is obtained principally with the Dow process, by electrolysis of fused magnesium chloride from brine and sea water. A saline solution containing  ions is first treated with lime (calcium oxide) and the precipitated magnesium hydroxide is collected:
 +  +  →  + 

The hydroxide is then converted to a partial hydrate of magnesium chloride by treating the hydroxide with hydrochloric acid and heating of the product:
 + 2 HCl →  + 2

The salt is then electrolyzed in the molten state. At the cathode, the  ion is reduced by two electrons to magnesium metal:
 + 2  → Mg

At the anode, each pair of  ions is oxidized to chlorine gas, releasing two electrons to complete the circuit:
2  →  (g) + 2 

 YSZ process
A new process, solid oxide membrane technology, involves the electrolytic reduction of MgO. At the cathode,  ion is reduced by two electrons to magnesium metal. The electrolyte is yttria-stabilized zirconia (YSZ). The anode is a liquid metal. At the YSZ/liquid metal anode  is oxidized. A layer of graphite borders the liquid metal anode, and at this interface carbon and oxygen react to form carbon monoxide. When silver is used as the liquid metal anode, there is no reductant carbon or hydrogen needed, and only oxygen gas is evolved at the anode. It has been reported that this method provides a 40% reduction in cost per pound over the electrolytic reduction method.

History 
The name magnesium originates from the Greek word for locations related to the tribe of the Magnetes, either a district in Thessaly called Magnesia or Magnesia ad Sipylum, now in Turkey. It is related to magnetite and manganese, which also originated from this area, and required differentiation as separate substances. See manganese for this history.

In 1618, a farmer at Epsom in England attempted to give his cows water from a well there. The cows refused to drink because of the water's bitter taste, but the farmer noticed that the water seemed to heal scratches and rashes. The substance became known as Epsom salts and its fame spread. It was eventually recognized as hydrated magnesium sulfate, ·7.

The metal itself was first isolated by Sir Humphry Davy in England in 1808. He used electrolysis on a mixture of magnesia and mercuric oxide. Antoine Bussy prepared it in coherent form in 1831. Davy's first suggestion for a name was magnium, but the name magnesium is now used in English and all major European languages but Russian.

Uses as a metal

Magnesium is the third-most-commonly-used structural metal, following iron and aluminium. The main applications of magnesium are, in order: aluminium alloys, die-casting (alloyed with zinc), removing sulfur in the production of iron and steel, and the production of titanium in the Kroll process.

Magnesium is used in lightweight materials and alloys. For example, when infused with silicon carbide nanoparticles, it has extremely high specific strength.

Historically, magnesium was one of the main aerospace construction metals and was used for German military aircraft as early as World War I and extensively for German aircraft in World War II. The Germans coined the name "Elektron" for magnesium alloy, a term which is still used today. In the commercial aerospace industry, magnesium was generally restricted to engine-related components, due to fire and corrosion hazards. Magnesium alloy use in aerospace is increasing in the 21st century, driven by the importance of fuel economy. Recent developments in metallurgy and manufacturing have allowed for the potential for magnesium alloys to act as replacements for aluminium and steel alloys in certain applications.

In the form of thin ribbons, magnesium is used to purify solvents; for example, preparing super-dry ethanol.

Aircraft
 Wright Aeronautical used a magnesium crankcase in the WWII-era Wright R-3350 Duplex Cyclone aviation engine. This presented a serious problem for the earliest models of the Boeing B-29 Superfortress heavy bomber when an in-flight engine fire ignited the engine crankcase. The resulting combustion was as hot as 5,600 °F (3,100 °C) and could sever the wing spar from the fuselage.

Automotive

 Mercedes-Benz used the alloy Elektron in the bodywork of an early model Mercedes-Benz 300 SLR; these cars competed in the 1955 World Sportscar Championship including a win at the Mille Miglia, and at Le Mans where one was involved in the 1955 Le Mans disaster when spectators were showered with burning fragments of elektron.
 Porsche used magnesium alloy frames in the 917/053 that won Le Mans in 1971, and continues to use magnesium alloys for its engine blocks due to the weight advantage.
 Volkswagen Group has used magnesium in its engine components for many years.
 Mitsubishi Motors uses magnesium for its paddle shifters.
 BMW used magnesium alloy blocks in their N52 engine, including an aluminium alloy insert for the cylinder walls and cooling jackets surrounded by a high-temperature magnesium alloy AJ62A. The engine was used worldwide between 2005 and 2011 in various 1, 3, 5, 6, and 7 series models; as well as the Z4, X1, X3, and X5.
 Chevrolet used the magnesium alloy AE44 in the 2006 Corvette Z06.
Both AJ62A and AE44 are recent developments in high-temperature low-creep magnesium alloys. The general strategy for such alloys is to form intermetallic precipitates at the grain boundaries, for example by adding mischmetal or calcium. New alloy development and lower costs that make magnesium competitive with aluminium will increase the number of automotive applications.

Electronics
Because of low density and good mechanical and electrical properties, magnesium is used for manufacturing of mobile phones, laptop and tablet computers, cameras, and other electronic components. It was used as a premium feature because of its light weight in some 2020 laptops.

Other
Magnesium, being readily available and relatively nontoxic, has a variety of uses:
It produces intense, bright, white light when it burns. Magnesium's high combustion temperature makes it a useful tool for starting emergency fires. Other uses include flash photography, flares, pyrotechnics, fireworks sparklers, and trick birthday candles. Magnesium is also often used to ignite thermite or other materials that require a high ignition temperature. Magnesium continues to be used as an incendiary element in warfare.
 In the form of turnings or ribbons, to prepare Grignard reagents, which are useful in organic synthesis.
 As an additive agent in conventional propellants and the production of nodular graphite in cast iron.
 As a reducing agent to separate uranium and other metals from their salts.
 As a sacrificial (galvanic) anode to protect boats, underground tanks, pipelines, buried structures, and water heaters.
 Alloyed with zinc to produce the zinc sheet used in photoengraving plates in the printing industry, dry-cell battery walls, and roofing.
 As a metal, this element's principal use is as an alloying additive to aluminium with these aluminium-magnesium alloys being used mainly for beverage cans, sports equipment such as golf clubs, fishing reels, and archery bows and arrows.
 Specialty, high-grade car wheels of magnesium alloy are called "mag wheels", although the term is often misapplied to aluminium wheels. Many car and aircraft manufacturers have made engine and body parts from magnesium.
 Magnesium batteries have been commercialized as primary batteries, and are an active topic of research for rechargeable batteries.

Safety precautions

Magnesium metal and its alloys can be explosive hazards; they are highly flammable in their pure form when molten or in powder or ribbon form. Burning or molten magnesium reacts violently with water. When working with powdered magnesium, safety glasses with eye protection and UV filters (such as welders use) are employed because burning magnesium produces ultraviolet light that can permanently damage the retina of a human eye.

Magnesium is capable of reducing water and releasing highly flammable hydrogen gas:

Mg (s) + 2  (l) →  (s) +  (g)

Therefore, water cannot extinguish magnesium fires. The hydrogen gas produced intensifies the fire. Dry sand is an effective smothering agent, but only on relatively level and flat surfaces.

Magnesium reacts with carbon dioxide exothermically to form magnesium oxide and carbon:

2 Mg +  → 2 MgO + C (s)

Hence, carbon dioxide fuels rather than extinguishes magnesium fires.

Burning magnesium can be quenched by using a Class D dry chemical fire extinguisher, or by covering the fire with sand or magnesium foundry flux to remove its air source.

Useful compounds
Magnesium compounds, primarily magnesium oxide (MgO), are used as a refractory material in furnace linings for producing iron, steel, nonferrous metals, glass, and cement. Magnesium oxide and other magnesium compounds are also used in the agricultural, chemical, and construction industries. Magnesium oxide from calcination is used as an electrical insulator in fire-resistant cables.

Magnesium hydride is under investigation as a way to store hydrogen.

Magnesium reacted with an alkyl halide gives a Grignard reagent, which is a very useful tool for preparing alcohols.

Magnesium salts are included in various foods, fertilizers (magnesium is a component of chlorophyll), and microbe culture media.

Magnesium sulfite is used in the manufacture of paper (sulfite process).

Magnesium phosphate is used to fireproof wood used in construction.

Magnesium hexafluorosilicate is used for moth-proofing textiles.

Biological roles

Mechanism of action
The important interaction between phosphate and magnesium ions makes magnesium essential to the basic nucleic acid chemistry of all cells of all known living organisms. More than 300 enzymes require magnesium ions for their catalytic action, including all enzymes using or synthesizing ATP and those that use other nucleotides to synthesize DNA and RNA. The ATP molecule is normally found in a chelate with a magnesium ion.

Nutrition

Diet
 Spices, nuts, cereals, cocoa and vegetables are rich sources of magnesium. Green leafy vegetables such as spinach are also rich in magnesium.

Beverages rich in magnesium are coffee, tea, and cocoa.

Dietary recommendations 
In the UK, the recommended daily values for magnesium are 300 mg for men and 270 mg for women. In the U.S. the Recommended Dietary Allowances (RDAs) are 400 mg for men ages 19–30 and 420 mg for older; for women 310 mg for ages 19–30 and 320 mg for older.

Supplementation
Numerous pharmaceutical preparations of magnesium and dietary supplements are available. In two human trials magnesium oxide, one of the most common forms in magnesium dietary supplements because of its high magnesium content per weight, was less bioavailable than magnesium citrate, chloride, lactate or aspartate.

Metabolism
An adult body has 22–26 grams of magnesium, with 60% in the skeleton, 39% intracellular (20% in skeletal muscle), and 1% extracellular. Serum levels are typically 0.7–1.0 mmol/L or 1.8–2.4 mEq/L. Serum magnesium levels may be normal even when intracellular magnesium is deficient. The mechanisms for maintaining the magnesium level in the serum are varying gastrointestinal absorption and renal excretion. Intracellular magnesium is correlated with intracellular potassium. Increased magnesium lowers calcium and can either prevent hypercalcemia or cause hypocalcemia depending on the initial level. Both low and high protein intake conditions inhibit magnesium absorption, as does the amount of phosphate, phytate, and fat in the gut. Unabsorbed dietary magnesium is excreted in feces; absorbed magnesium is excreted in urine and sweat.

Detection in serum and plasma 
Magnesium status may be assessed by measuring serum and erythrocyte magnesium concentrations coupled with urinary and fecal magnesium content, but intravenous magnesium loading tests are more accurate and practical. A retention of 20% or more of the injected amount indicates deficiency. As of 2004, no biomarker has been established for magnesium.

Magnesium concentrations in plasma or serum may be monitored for efficacy and safety in those receiving the drug therapeutically, to confirm the diagnosis in potential poisoning victims, or to assist in the forensic investigation in a case of fatal overdose. The newborn children of mothers who received parenteral magnesium sulfate during labor may exhibit toxicity with normal serum magnesium levels.

Deficiency
Low plasma magnesium (hypomagnesemia) is common: it is found in 2.5–15% of the general population. From 2005 to 2006, 48 percent of the United States population consumed less magnesium than recommended in the Dietary Reference Intake. Other causes are increased renal or gastrointestinal loss, an increased intracellular shift, and proton-pump inhibitor antacid therapy. Most are asymptomatic, but symptoms referable to neuromuscular, cardiovascular, and metabolic dysfunction may occur. Alcoholism is often associated with magnesium deficiency. Chronically low serum magnesium levels are associated with metabolic syndrome, diabetes mellitus type 2, fasciculation, and hypertension.

Therapy
 Intravenous magnesium is recommended by the ACC/AHA/ESC 2006 Guidelines for Management of Patients With Ventricular Arrhythmias and the Prevention of Sudden Cardiac Death for patients with ventricular arrhythmia associated with torsades de pointes who present with long QT syndrome; and for the treatment of patients with digoxin induced arrhythmias.
 Magnesium sulfate – intravenous – is used for the management of pre-eclampsia and eclampsia.
 Hypomagnesemia, including that caused by alcoholism, is reversible by oral or parenteral magnesium administration depending on the degree of deficiency.
 There is limited evidence that magnesium supplementation may play a role in the prevention and treatment of migraine.

Sorted by type of magnesium salt, other therapeutic applications include:
 Magnesium sulfate, as the heptahydrate called Epsom salts, is used as bath salts, a laxative, and a highly soluble fertilizer.
 Magnesium hydroxide, suspended in water, is used in milk of magnesia antacids and laxatives.
 Magnesium chloride, oxide, gluconate, malate, orotate, glycinate, ascorbate and citrate are all used as oral magnesium supplements. 
 Magnesium borate, magnesium salicylate, and magnesium sulfate are used as antiseptics.
 Magnesium bromide is used as a mild sedative (this action is due to the bromide, not the magnesium).
 Magnesium stearate is a slightly flammable white powder with lubricating properties. In pharmaceutical technology, it is used in pharmacological manufacture to prevent tablets from sticking to the equipment while compressing the ingredients into tablet form.
 Magnesium carbonate powder is used by athletes such as gymnasts, weightlifters, and climbers to eliminate palm sweat, prevent sticking, and improve the grip on gymnastic apparatus, lifting bars, and climbing rocks.

Overdose
Overdose from dietary sources alone is unlikely because excess magnesium in the blood is promptly filtered by the kidneys, and overdose is more likely in the presence of impaired renal function. In spite of this, megadose therapy has caused death in a young child, and severe hypermagnesemia in a woman and a young girl who had healthy kidneys.
The most common symptoms of overdose are nausea, vomiting, and diarrhea; other symptoms include hypotension, confusion, slowed heart and respiratory rates, deficiencies of other minerals, coma, cardiac arrhythmia, and death from cardiac arrest.

Function in plants
Plants require magnesium to synthesize chlorophyll, essential for photosynthesis. Magnesium in the center of the porphyrin ring in chlorophyll functions in a manner similar to the iron in the center of the porphyrin ring in heme. Magnesium deficiency in plants causes late-season yellowing between leaf veins, especially in older leaves, and can be corrected by either applying epsom salts (which is rapidly leached), or crushed dolomitic limestone, to the soil.

See also 
 List of countries by magnesium production
 Magnesium oil

References

Cited sources

External links 
 Magnesium at The Periodic Table of Videos (University of Nottingham)
 Chemistry in its element podcast (MP3) from the Royal Society of Chemistry's Chemistry World: Magnesium
 

 
Chemical elements
Alkaline earth metals
Dietary minerals
Food additives
Pyrotechnic fuels
Reducing agents
Chemical elements with hexagonal close-packed structure